Valea Mare is a commune in Covasna County, Transylvania Romania. It is composed of a single village, Valea Mare, which was part of Barcani Commune before being split off in 1999. The commune is located 21 km southeast from Sfântu Gheorghe, in the valley of the stream Valea Mare (Nagypatak). Its Orthodox church was built in 1793. 

The Valea Mare monastery was built in 1998 on the initiative of Gheorghe Avram as a monastery situated in the center of  Romania.

Demographics
The commune has absolute ethnic Romanian majority. According to the 2002 Census it has a population of 1,177 of which 97.45% or 1147 are Romanians. Other minorities are Roma and Hungarians, respectively 1.44% and 1.10% of the population.

References

External links
 Valea Mare official page

Communes in Covasna County
Localities in Transylvania